Quercus glaucescens is a species of oak endemic to Mexico.

References

glaucescens
Endemic oaks of Mexico
Plants described in 1809
Flora of the Sierra Madre Occidental
Flora of the Sierra Madre Oriental
Flora of the Sierra Madre de Oaxaca
Flora of the Sierra Madre del Sur
Flora of the Trans-Mexican Volcanic Belt
Flora of Los Tuxtlas
Taxa named by Aimé Bonpland